Saving Capitalism is a 2017 documentary film directed by Jacob Kornbluth and Sari Gilman, following former Secretary of Labor and Professor Robert Reich, speaking about the current state of the American economic system, and presents ideas how to "save capitalism".

The film was released by Netflix on November 11, 2017.

Premise
The documentary is based on the book 'Saving Capitalism: For the Many, Not the Few' by Robert Reich. It follows the evolution of capitalism in America, from its beginnings to its current state.

Cast
 Robert Reich

References

External links
 
 
 

2017 documentary films
2017 films
Netflix original documentary films
Works about capitalism
2010s English-language films